I Supermodel 3 is the third season of the Chinese reality show and modeling competition of the same name. Filming for season three took place in Los Angeles. The show featured 14 new contestants in the final cast, and premiered on October 14, 2016.

The prizes for this cycle included a modelling contract with NEXT Model Management, a shopping spree worth 50.000$ at Los Angeles Citadel Outlets and an I Supermodel pearls crown.

The winner of the competition was 19-year-old Yan Yu Bo.

Contestants 
(ages stated are at time of contest)

Episodes

Episode 1 
Original Airdate: 

 Team Ace: Dong Yi Hang, Fu Huan Huan, Jinx Zhou, Lou Qing, Naomi Kang, Niu Wei Wei & Wang Xin Lei
 Team Queen: Abby Jiang, Chen Xiao Han, Han Hong Pan, Kelly Qian, Li Ya Wen, Pang Ying & Yan Yu Bo

Episode 2 
Original Airdate: 

 Best photo: Abby Jiang
 Bottom three: Chen Xiao Han, Kelly Qian & Li Ya Wen
 Eliminated: Chen Xiao Han & Li Ya Wen

Episode 3 
Original Airdate: 

 Best photo: Lou Qing
 Bottom two: Dong Yi Hang & Niu Wei Wei
 Eliminated: Niu Wei Wei

Episode 4 
Original Airdate: 

 Best photo: Dong Yi Hang
 Bottom two: Jinx Zhou & Kelly Qian
 Eliminated: Jinx Zhou
 Guest judge: Coco Rocha

Episode 5 
Original Airdate: 

 Best photo: Pang Ying
 Bottom three: Naomi Kang, Wang Xin Lei & Yan Yu Bo
 Eliminated: Naomi Kang

Episode 6 
Original Airdate: 

 Quit: Kelly Qian
 Best photo: Yan Yu Bo
 Originally eliminated: Wang Xin Lei

Episode 7 
Original Airdate: 

 Best photo: Yan Yu Bo
 Bottom two: Abby Jiang & Dong Yi Hang
 Eliminated: Dong Yi Hang

Episode 8 
Original Airdate: 

 Best photo: Fu Huan Huan
 Bottom two: Abby Jiang & Wang Xin Lei
 Eliminated: None

Episode 9 
Original Airdate: 

 Immune from elimination: Fu Huan Huan
 Best photo: Abby Jiang
 Bottom three: Han Hong Pan, Lou Qing & Wang Xin Lei
 Eliminated: Han Hong Pan & Wang Xin Lei

Episode 10 
Original Airdate: 

 Best photo: Yan Yu Bo
 Bottom two: Abby Jiang & Lou Qing
 Eliminated: Lou Qing

Episode 11 
Original Airdate: 

 Best photo: Yan Yu Bo
 Bottom two: Abby Jiang & Fu Huan Huan
 Eliminated: Abby Jiang

Episode 12 
Original Airdate: 

 Eliminated: Pang Ying
 Final two: Fu Huan Huan & Yan Yu Bo
 Winner: Yan Yu Bo

Summaries

Call-out order

  The contestant received best photo
  The contestant was in the danger of elimination
  The contestant was eliminated
  The contestant was immune from elimination
  The contestant won the competition

In episode 1, there was no elimination and the models were divided into their teams.
In episode 2, there was a double elimination. All of the contestants from team Ace were safe. In team Queen, Kelly, Xiao Han, and Ya Wen were chosen as the bottom three. The last contestant saved was Kelly, and the other two were eliminated.
In episode 6, Kelly withdrew from the competition. As a result, the original eliminee Xin Lei was saved from elimination.
In episode 8, Abby and Xin Lei landed in the bottom two, but no one was eliminated.
In episode 9, Huan Huan was granted immunity from elimination after having booked the most shows in New York Fashion Week.

Photo shoot guide
 Episode 1 photo & video shoot: Simplistic beauty; opening sequence
 Episode 2 photo shoot: American football 
 Episode 3 photo shoot: Vintage motel 
 Episode 4 photo shoot: Edgy dominatrix with male models
 Episode 5 photo shoot: Burlesque
 Episode 6 photo shoot: Colorful fashion in Salvation Mountain
 Episode 7 photo shoot: Posing with unique models
 Episode 8 photo shoot: Damp haired beauty in a villa
 Episode 9 photo shoot: New York Mafia
 Episode 10 photo shoot: Superheroes 
 Episode 11 photo shoot: Sex and the City
 Episode 12 photo shoot: Comp cards

External links
 Weibo site

I Supermodel
2016 Chinese television seasons